The 2003–04 Serie A season was the 70th season of the Serie A, the top level of ice hockey in Italy. 15 teams participated in the league, and the HC Milano Vipers won the championship by defeating Asiago Hockey in the final.

First round

Final round

Playoffs

External links
 Season on hockeyarchives.info

Serie A (ice hockey) seasons
Italy
2003–04 in Italian ice hockey